The Clergy Marriage Act 1551 (5 & 6 Edw 6 c 12) was an Act of the Parliament of England.

The whole Act, so far as unrepealed, was repealed by section 1 of, and Part II of the Schedule to, the Statute Law (Repeals) Act 1969.

Section 2
This section was repealed by section 56 of, and Part I of Schedule 2 to, the Administration of Estates Act 1925.

Section 4
This section was repealed by section 1 of, and the Schedule to, the Statute Law Revision Act 1887.

See also
Marriage Act
Halsbury's Statutes

References

Acts of the Parliament of England (1485–1603)
1551 in law
1551 in England
Marriage law
Marriage, unions and partnerships in England
Repealed English legislation
Marriage and religion